He Changgong (January 27, 1901 – December 29, 1987) was a Chinese male politician, who served as the vice chairperson of the Chinese People's Political Consultative Conference.

References 

1901 births
1987 deaths
Delegates to the 7th National Congress of the Chinese Communist Party
Vice Chairpersons of the National Committee of the Chinese People's Political Consultative Conference